Chetone salvini is a moth of the family Erebidae. It was described by Jean Baptiste Boisduval in 1870. It is found in Central America.

References

Chetone
Moths described in 1870